The Mattagami First Nation is an Anishnaabe First Nation band government - mainly Ojibwe, Oji-Cree and some Odawa - in the Canadian province of Ontario situated along the Mattagami River. The First Nation members of the community primarily live on the Mattagami 71 reserve in the Sudbury District near Gogama.  The on-reserve population is approximately 100 residents.

Mattagami First Nation is part of the Wabun Tribal Council, a political organization which is also part of the Nishnawbe-Aski Nation (NAN), representing the Treaty 9 area.  The current chief of the Mattagami First Nation is Chad Boissoneau.

The reserve has its own elementary school, while high school students are bused to Timmins.

References

External links
 Mattagami First Nation

First Nations governments in Ontario
Communities in Sudbury District
Ojibwe reserves in Ontario
Oji-Cree reserves in Ontario
Odawa reserves in Ontario